is a Japanese animation studio based in Nakano, Tokyo.

Establishment
The studio was founded in South Kōenji, Tokyo in October 2017 by Tamotsu Kosano, serving a subsidiary of Japanese mass media corporation Geek Pictures, before moving to Nakano, Tokyo in February 2020.

Works

Television series

Films

References

External links

  
 

 
Animation studios in Tokyo
Japanese animation studios
Japanese companies established in 2017
Mass media companies established in 2017
Nakano, Tokyo